Christine Hahn-Scheiblich ( Scheiblich; born 31 December 1954) is a German rower and Olympic champion.

Scheiblich was born in 1954 in Wilsdruff, Saxony. She took up rowing in 1968.

She received a gold medal in single sculls at the 1976 Summer Olympics in Montreal. Her last competition was the 1978 World Rowing Championships in New Zealand where she won her final gold medal.

On 22 July 1978, Scheiblich married Ulrich Hahn, who was a world championship luger during the late 1970s and early 1980s. Scheiblich studied physiotherapy from 1978 to 1981 and later worked in that occupation in Dresden.

References

External links
 

1954 births
Living people
East German female rowers
Olympic rowers of Germany
Olympic gold medalists for East Germany
Rowers at the 1976 Summer Olympics
Olympic medalists in rowing
World Rowing Championships medalists for East Germany
Medalists at the 1976 Summer Olympics
People from Sächsische Schweiz-Osterzgebirge
Sportspeople from Saxony